Ekspress (Russian: , literally Express) is a communication and broadcasting system developed and operated by Russian Satellite Communications Company (RSCC). It is the largest network of Russia and its slots cover an arc in geostationary orbit from 14.0° West to 145.0° East. This allows it to cover the whole territory of Russia, the CIS, Europe, the Middle East, Africa, the Asia-Pacific region, North and South America, and Australia.

The only other Russian civilian satellite operator is Gazprom Space Systems with its Yamal constellation.

Ekspress satellite series 
While the Ekspress constellation started with a single model, during the years it has used many suppliers and many models.

See also 

 Telecommunications in Russia
 Russian Satellite Communications Company – Satellite communication company of the Ministry of Telecom and Mass Communications of the Russian Federation and owner of the Ekspress satellite series.
 Gazprom Space Systems – Satellite communication division of the Russian oil giant Gazprom and owner of the Yamal system and the only other Russian satellite operator.
 Yamal (satellite constellation) – The only other Russian civilian communications satellite constellation.

References

External links 
 Russian Satellite Communications Company

Communications satellites of Russia